The 2006 Team Ice Racing World Championship was the 28th edition of the Team World Championship. The final was held on ?, 2006, in Berlin, in Germany. Russia won their 12th title.

Final Classification

See also 
 2006 Individual Ice Speedway World Championship
 2006 Speedway World Cup in classic speedway
 2006 Speedway Grand Prix in classic speedway

References 

Ice speedway competitions
World